The Journal of Hispanic Higher Education is a peer-reviewed academic journal that publishes papers four times a year in the fields of education and ethnic interests. The journal's editor is Esther Elena López-Mulnix, PhD. It has been in publication since 2002 and is currently published by SAGE Publications.

Scope 
The Journal of Hispanic Higher Education is devoted to the advancement of knowledge and understanding of issues at Hispanic-serving institutions. The journal is interdisciplinary and publishes both quantitative and qualitative articles that specifically relate to issues of interest at Hispanic-serving institutions of higher learning worldwide.

Abstracting and indexing 
The Journal of Hispanic Higher Education is abstracted and indexed in the following databases:
 Contents Pages in Education
 Educational Administration Abstracts
 Educational Research Abstracts Online
 SCOPUS
 Social Services Abstracts

External links 
 

SAGE Publishing academic journals
English-language journals
Education journals